Sherman H. Skolnick (July 13, 1930 – May 21, 2006) was a Chicago-based activist and conspiracy theorist.

Early life

Born in Chicago in 1930, at the age of six, Skolnick was paralyzed by polio, and he used a wheelchair for the rest of his life. His parents, a homemaker and a tailor, were Jewish European immigrants. Skolnick's father was from Russia.

Career
Skolnick was founder and chairman of the Citizens' Committee to Clean Up the Courts, which he started in 1963. He used the local press to distribute his reports, later establishing a telephone hotline–"Hotline News", a public-access television show on cable TV, and a web site.

Skolnick's investigations put Otto Kerner Jr. in prison for three years; and led to the resignation of two Illinois Supreme Court justices, Roy J. Solfisburg, Jr. and Ray Klingbiel, who, as Skolnick reported, had accepted bribes of stock from a defendant in a case on which they ruled. The scandal catapulted John Paul Stevens, special counsel to an investigating commission, to fame as a justice of the U.S. Supreme Court. In 2001, the story became the subject of a book, Illinois Justice, by Kenneth A. Manaster. His investigations also revealed corruption at the Bank of Credit and Commerce International.

Skolnick's final written works include an 81-part series entitled "The Overthrow of the American Republic," and a 16-part series entitled "Coca-Cola, the CIA, and the Courts."

Later life and death
Skolnick died of a heart attack on May 21, 2006.

Publications

Articles
 "The Late Grand Dragon of the Washington Post." Skolnik's Report (July 23, 2001).

Books
 Ahead of the Parade: A Who's Who of Treason and High Crimes – Exclusive Details of Fraud and Corruption of the Monopoly Press, the Banks, the Bench and the Bar, and the Secret Political Police. Dandelion Books (2003).
 Overthrow of the American Republic: Writings of Sherman H. Skolnick. Dandelion Books (2007). .

References

External links
Official website archive
 
 Sherman Skolnick file at the FBI (via Internet Archive)
 Sherman Skolnick collection at the Harold Weisberg Archive (via Internet Archive)
 Sherman Skolnick Suit collection at the Harold Weisberg Archive (via Internet Archive)
"Sherman Skolnick Sounds Off!" Interview by Kenn Thomas.

1930 births
2006 deaths
Jewish American writers
American conspiracy theorists
People with polio
Journalists from Illinois
Writers from Chicago
Critics of the Catholic Church
American anti-corruption activists
20th-century American journalists
American male journalists
20th-century American Jews